Harold Martin Groves (October 3, 1897 – December 2, 1969) was a member of the Wisconsin State Assembly and the Wisconsin State Senate.

Biography
Groves was born on October 3, 1897 in Lodi, Wisconsin. He attended the University of Wisconsin–Madison and Harvard Law School. From 1927 to 1968, he was a member of the faculty of the University of Wisconsin–Madison. Groves died on December 2, 1969.

Political career
Groves was a member of the Senate from 1932 to 1936, at which time he was succeeded by Fred Risser. Previously, he was a member of the Assembly from 1930 to 1932. He was affiliated with the Wisconsin Progressive Party. One of his achievements in Wisconsin was the passage of the first unemployment compensation law in the United States, dubbed the Groves Law, in the early 1930s.

References

External links

Wisconsin state senators
Members of the Wisconsin State Assembly
Wisconsin Progressives (1924)
University of Wisconsin–Madison faculty
Harvard Law School alumni
University of Wisconsin–Madison alumni
People from Lodi, Wisconsin
1897 births
1969 deaths
20th-century American politicians